The REX Operating System (Real-time Executive Operating System) is a real-time operating system (RTOS) developed by Qualcomm for the ARM processor based mobile phone Dual-Mode Subscriber Station (DMSS) or Advanced Mode Subscriber Software (AMSS) development. As of 2007, most Korean cell phones ran on REX.

REX is a combination of two operating systems: L4A Pistachio embedded microkernel and Iguana, with extensive modifications and extensions by Qualcomm and HTC.

Originally developed for the Intel 80186, it was then ported to ARM, and x86 architectures are no longer supported. REX is not POSIX compliant or open-source software and requires a proprietary software license from Qualcomm for use.

It seems not to be actively developed or marketed as of 2012, but is used in currently or recently sold low end cell phones, typically for use by pay-as-you-go customers, like the Samsung SPH-M300.

Features
REX is an RTOS with the following features:
 Preemptive multitasking
 Task management
 Task synchronization
 Exclusive lock
 Timer
 Interrupt management
 Uses less than 5K of ROM

REX provides no memory protection features but does have memory management abilities.

References

External links
Iguana
L4 Based Operating Systems
NICTA L4-embedded Kernel
Qualcomm Corporate Site

Qualcomm software
Smartphone operating systems
Real-time operating systems
Embedded operating systems
Microkernel-based operating systems
Mobile operating systems
ARM operating systems
Microkernels